The All Japan Federation of Food Industries Workers' Unions (Shokuhin Roren) was a trade union representing workers in the food processing industry of Japan.

The union was founded in 1965 and was affiliated with the Federation of Independent Unions.  By 1970, it had 93,898 members, but by 1990, it was down to 58,467 members.  By then, it was affiliated with the Japanese Trade Union Confederation.  In 1995, it merged with the Japan Tobacco and Allied Workers' Union and the National Federation of Food Industry Workers' Unions, to form the Japan Federation of Foods and Tobacco Workers' Unions.

References

Food processing trade unions
Trade unions established in 1965
Trade unions disestablished in 1995
Trade unions in Japan